Cefn Golau is a disused cholera cemetery situated on a narrow mountain ridge in the county borough of Blaenau Gwent, and located between Rhymney and Tredegar in south-east Wales. A suburb of Tredegar and a nearby feeder reservoir (or pond) have the same name. The graves date from 1832 to 1855 with many for August and September 1849.

History
The cholera burial ground dates back to the 19th century. At that time, sporadic outbreaks of cholera occurred in various parts of Britain. The causes of the disease were not understood until 1854 and the victims were buried in specially designated burial grounds in remote locations because of the widespread fear of the infection.

The first major cholera epidemic to strike Tredegar was in 1832-33. This outbreak was part of a world wide pandemic that arrived in England in October 1831. A more serious one followed in 1849 in London where it took over 14,000 lives. It was twice as bad as the outbreak in the 1830s in England and it was also worse in Cefn Golau. There was also a smaller outbreak in 1866. In 1849, the disease had already struck the neighbouring communities of Rhymney in July and Nantyglo in August before reaching the town. As the number of victims rose, scarcely a street in Tredegar remained unaffected. The doctors searched for remedies without success, people left their homes and fled into the countryside while others stayed indoors. Many sought help from their religion and the chapels were packed, but the death toll still mounted. People could appear to be fit in the morning and then be dead by evening. The disease caused so much fear that few people were willing to help bury the victims. With the arrival of colder and wetter weather in the autumn, the number of new infections gradually dwindled. This outbreak killed 52,000 people in England and Wales.

Scheduled monument 
The cemetery is a Scheduled Ancient Monument. The headstones dating from 1832 are few in number, small, with boldly cut scripts and elegant floral designs. The stones from the 1849 outbreak are much larger and more numerous, with most of the deaths dating from the months of August and September when the epidemic was at its peak. There is a single stone dated 1866 when the third outbreak took place - this was the smallest and the last in the area.

This burial ground on its remote windswept site has long been abandoned but a few gravestones still stand in the sheep-nibbled turf. One is a memorial to Thomas James, who died on 18 August 1849, aged 24 years. The inscription reads:

One night and day I bore great pain,
To try for cure was all in vain,
But God knew what to me was best,
Did ease my pain and give me rest.

Some of the gravestones are in English, others in Welsh and some are in a mixture of the two languages.

References

External links 
Headstone inscriptions.

Cemeteries in Wales
Geography of Blaenau Gwent
Buildings and structures in Blaenau Gwent
Scheduled monuments in Wales
Cholera monuments and memorials